Jeffrey Daniels is an American architect.  Based in Los Angeles, Daniels is known for his iconic buildings, such as the award-winning KFC building on Western Avenue in Los Angeles. Other notable works include the David Hockney Residence in the Hollywood Hills, the Lookout Mountain Residence in Laurel Canyon and the Edythe and Eli Broad Studios at the California Institute of the Arts.   Daniels was part of the early wave of young architects to apprentice in the office of Frank Gehry.

Daniels began studying architecture as an undergraduate at Princeton University and went on to get his Master's degree from the Massachusetts Institute of Technology.  He first worked in the Taller de Arquitectura founded by Ricardo Bofill in Barcelona, Spain.  He then came to Los Angeles where he worked for Gehry on such projects as the Loyola Law School near downtown Los Angeles.  In 1981, he founded Grinstein/Daniels Architects with Elyse Grinstein. Daniels served as the firm's principal in charge of design and went on to create many of the firm's signature works.  In 1992 Daniels formed Jeffrey Daniels Architects.  His KFC building was part of the museum exhibition entitled “Overdrive: LA Constructs the Future,” which opened at the Getty Museum in April, 2013  and at the National Building Museum in Washington D.C. in October, 2013. In 2016 Daniels was elevated to Fellowship in the American Institute of Architects.

References

External links 
 Jeffrey Daniels Architects 
 

Postmodern architects
Living people
Architects from Los Angeles
Princeton University School of Architecture alumni
MIT School of Architecture and Planning alumni
Year of birth missing (living people)